The Diet of Worms is a Big Finish Productions audio drama featuring Lisa Bowerman as Bernice Summerfield, a character from the spin-off media based on the long-running British science fiction television series Doctor Who.

Plot 
Bernice applies for a job at the Depository - a place where all the great literary achievements of the human race are stored.

Cast
Bernice Summerfield - Lisa Bowerman
Peter Summerfield - Thomas Grant
Panthea Vyse - Catherine Harvey
Myrtle Bunnage/Mrs Tishpishti/Robots - Beth Chalmers
Examiner - Matthew Sweet
Robots - Ralf Collie

External links
Big Finish Productions - Professor Bernice Summerfield: The Diet of Worms

Bernice Summerfield audio plays
Fiction set in the 27th century